Adam George Peaty  (born 28 December 1994) is an English competitive swimmer who specialises in the breaststroke. He won the gold medal in the 100 metre breaststroke at the 2016 Summer Olympics, the first by a male British swimmer in 24 years, and retained the title at the 2020 Summer Olympics in 2021, the first British swimmer ever to retain an Olympic title. He is also an eight-time World Champion, a sixteen-time European Champion and a four-time Commonwealth Champion. According to FINA itself, Peaty is widely regarded as the dominant breaststroke swimmer of his era, and the most dominant sprint breaststroke swimmer of all time.

Peaty is the holder of the world record in 50 metre and 100 metre breaststroke events, and is unbeaten in either event in a long-course global championships since 2014, a streak of eight consecutive global titles across both events, a streak of titles only broken by injury-caused absence in 2022. He has broken world records 14 times, becoming the first man to swim under 26 seconds for the 50 metre breaststroke and the first to swim the 100 metre breaststroke under both 58 and 57 seconds. He is the first swimmer ever to win both sprint breaststroke events at the same World championships, and the most successful British swimmer in a single World Championships.

Peaty is one of only five British swimmers, with David Wilkie, Rebecca Adlington, James Guy, and Duncan Scott to have won gold medals at all four major international events (Olympic, World, European and Commonwealth Games), and with David Wilkie the only swimmers to hold all four major gold medals in the same single event at the same time, a feat he completed in winning the 100 metre breaststroke at the 2016 Olympics, and which he uniquely maintained through the 2020 Olympics. Peaty is a six-time European swimmer of the year which he has won consecutively from 2014 to 2019, and also a two-time World swimmer of the year in 2015 and 2018.

Early life
Adam Peaty was born on 28 December 1994 in Uttoxeter, Staffordshire to Mark and Caroline Peaty, the youngest of four children. He attended St Josephs Catholic Primary School in Uttoxeter, Painsley Catholic College in Cheadle and Derby College. As a young boy, he developed an acute fear of water and was averse to being put in the bath after his brothers told him that sharks may come up through the plughole. At four years of age Peaty and his friend both went on their first swimming lesson together. It was at this swimming lesson where he lost the fear.

Peaty first joined Dove Valley Swimming Club in Uttoxeter when he was nine, and started to win races and setting club records by the time he was twelve.  When he was 14, a friend took Peaty to join City of Derby Swimming Club, but the coach at the club, former Olympic swimmer Melanie Marshall, was not impressed by Peaty's performance in the freestyle and put him in the slow lane with younger girls. However, she noticed "something special" the first time she saw him swim breaststroke. She also recognised the advantages of his large hands, big feet, "extraordinary cardiovascular system", and hyper-mobile, double-jointed knees and ankles. According to Peaty, he did not take swimming seriously until he was 17 – he was preparing for a night out drinking with friends when he read that Craig Benson, whom he knew well from the junior circuit, made the semi-final of the 100m breaststroke at the 2012 London Olympics. This prompted him to reassess his priorities, and spurred him on to commit fully to swimming and train full-time.

Career

Peaty started training at the City of Derby swimming club in 2009, where he was coached by Melanie Marshall. He also trained up to eight times per week at Repton School, a co-educational boarding independent school in the village of Repton in Derbyshire, and two sessions at Loughborough University. He started to train full-time at Loughborough University in 2017.

Peaty's first senior event was the 2013 European Short Course Swimming Championships where he achieved three personal best times in the three breaststroke events.

2014
At the 2014 Commonwealth Games in Glasgow, Scotland, Peaty entered four events: the 50 metre breaststroke, the 100 metre breaststroke, the 200 metre breaststroke, and the 4 × 100 metre medley relay. In the 50 metre breaststroke, Peaty qualified fastest out of the heats, setting a new Commonwealth Games record, before winning his semi-final to qualify second fastest for the final. He eventually finished second in the final with a time of 26.78", 0.02 seconds behind South African Cameron van der Burgh. In the 100 metre breaststroke, Peaty set new Commonwealth Games records in the heats, semi-finals and the final, posting a time of 58.94" to win the gold, 0.34 seconds faster than van der Burgh, who finished second. Olympic champion and world record holder van der Burgh was the favourite to win, but Peaty managed a record time for a British man in the event. In the 200 metre breaststroke, Peaty finished in fourth place, 0.15 seconds off a medal position and 2.72 seconds behind first-placed Scotsman Ross Murdoch. Peaty also won gold in the 4 x 100 metre medley relay with his team of Chris Walker-Hebborn, Adam Barrett and Adam Brown

At the 2014 European Championships, Peaty set his first ever world record. After winning his heat of the 50 metre breaststroke, he then clocked a new world-record time of 26.62" in the semi-final. He then went on to win gold in the final. He also set a second world record as part of the final of the 4 × 100 metre mixed medley relay, along with Walker-Hebborn, Jemma Lowe and Fran Halsall, with a time of 3':44.02". He also won the gold in the 100 metre breaststroke after winning all 3 of his races and the gold in the 4 x 100 metre medley relay along with Walker-Hebborn, Barrett and Ben Proud, ending the championships having won gold in 4 out of the 5 events he entered after not qualifying for the final of the 200 metre breaststroke.

In the 2014 World Short Course Championships, he rounded off his year with three silver medals in 50 metre breaststroke, 100 metre breaststroke and the 4 x 50 metre mixed medley relay, but again didn't qualify for the final of the 200 metre breaststroke.

2015

In 2015, Peaty's rise continued, breaking the world record for 100 metre breaststroke at the British Championships and World Trials by almost half a second. His time of 57.92 seconds made him the first man to go under 58 seconds for the event.  He qualified for all three breaststroke events at the 2015 World Aquatic Championships.

At the 2015 World Championships, he became a World Champion for the first time. He won gold in the 100 metre breaststroke after winning both his heat and semi-final in new championship records before beating Cameron van der Burgh in the final, with his British team-mate Ross Murdoch winning the bronze medal. In the 50 metre breaststroke, van der Burgh broke the world record in the heats, Peaty then broke it once more in the semi-finals with a time of 26.42 seconds. Peaty then won the final of the event, which his second gold of the championship with van der Burgh taking silver. Peaty added a third gold with a win in the 4 × 100 metre mixed medley relay with a new world-record time along with Walker-Hebborn, Siobhan-Marie O'Connor and Halsall. His team of Walker-Hebborn, James Guy and Proud finished fourth in the 4 x 100 metre medley relay just missing out on a medal and he did not qualify out of the heats in his weakest event, the 200 metre breaststroke.

Peaty rounded off his year by winning two silver medals at the 2015 European Short Course Swimming Championships in the 50 metre breaststroke and 100 metre breaststroke events.

2016 
At the 2016 European Championships held in London, Peaty retained both of his individual titles in the 50 metre breaststroke and the 100 metre breaststroke, comfortably winning all of his heat, semi final and final swims and sharing the podium with his team mate Ross Murdoch on both occasions. He also retained both of his relay titles winning the 4 × 100 metre medley relay with Walker-Hebborn, Guy and Duncan Scott, and the mixed 4 × 100 metre medley relay with Walker-Hebborn, O'Connor and Halsall. He did not enter the 200 metre breaststroke event and  had never entered the event again at a major championship.
Peaty only competed in the 100 metre breaststroke in the individual events as 50 metre breaststroke was not an Olympic swimming event at the 2016 Summer Olympics in Rio de Janeiro. In the heats, Peaty broke his own world record with a time of 57.55 seconds. He then won his semi-final and went on to win the final, breaking the new world record that he himself had set in the heats, and winning Team GB's first gold medal of the 2016 Olympics on 7 August 2016, winning with a time of 57.13 seconds. He won a further silver medal in the 4 × 100 metre medley relay with Walker-Hebborn, Guy and Scott.

2017
At the 2017 World Aquatics Championships, Peaty retained his 100 metre breaststroke title. After easily winning his heat and semi-final races, he won in the final winning the race with a championship record of 57.47 seconds. Peaty also broke his own world record twice in the 50 metre breaststroke. He recorded 26.10 seconds in the heats, and in the semi-final, he became the first man to break 26 seconds and won in 25.95 seconds. He successfully defended his 50 metre breaststroke title with another sub-26 time of  25.99 seconds in the final, completing another double at the World Championships with van der Burgh taking bronze. He won a further silver in the 4 × 100 metre medley relay at the World Championship, setting a new British record, with the same Olympic line-up of Walker-Hebborn, Guy and Scott, but missed out on a medal in the 4 x 100 metre mixed medley relay with Davies, Guy and O'Connor despite setting a new European record.

At the 2017 European Short Course Swimming Championships, Peaty won a bronze medal in the 50 metre breaststroke with a personal best time and setting a new British record. He then went on to win gold in the 100 metre breaststroke setting a new European record in the process, his first ever gold medal at a short course event.

2018
At the 2018 Commonwealth Games, Peaty defended his 100 metre breaststroke title, winning in a time of 58.84 seconds after setting a games record time in the semi final of 58.59, beating his team mate James Wilby in to silver medal position and his old rival van der Burgh in to bronze.  However, he finished second in the 50 metre breaststroke behind van der Burgh, the first time he had failed to win a 50 metre breaststroke race for 4 years since he lost to him at the 2014 Commonwealth Games. He also helped his England team win a silver medal in the 4 × 100 metre medley relay with Luke Greenbank, Guy and Proud.

At the 2018 European Championships, Peaty once again defended his European title in the 100 metre breaststroke, beating his own world record with a time recorded as 57.00 seconds, which was corrected to 57.10" the next day. He added a second gold when he won as part of the team in the 4 × 100 metre  mixed medley relay with Georgia Davies, Guy and Freya Anderson, and a third in the 50 metre breaststroke setting three championship records in a row to win the gold. He brought his tally at the championships to four golds after winning the 4 × 100 metre medley relay as part of the British team with Nicholas Pyle, Guy and Scott which made him Britain's first three-time quadruple champion at the European Championships.

At the end of the European Championships, He held the eleven best times in history for the 50 metre breaststroke and the fourteen best times in the 100 metre breaststroke.

2019
At the 2019 World Aquatics Championships held in Gwangju, South Korea, Peaty broke his own world record in the semi-final of the 100 metre breaststroke with a time of 56.88", and became the first man to break 57 seconds in the event, before anybody else had swum in under 58 seconds. He retained his 100 metre title in the final, after finishing first in front of his training partner James Wilby. He won the gold in the 50 metre breaststroke for the third time, completing the triple double at the World Championships. He also won a bronze in the 4 × 100 metre mixed medley relay with Davies, Guy and Anderson. Peaty made this his most successful world championships yet after winning his third gold in the 4 × 100 metre medley relay together with Greenbank, Guy and Scott, the first gold won by the British team in this event at the Championships. He helped the team finish first in a European record time of 3 minutes, 28.10 seconds to beat the United States.

Peaty competed in the inaugural season of the International Swimming League in 2019 and was one of the main supporters for the leagues creation. Peaty was chosen as team captain for London Roar and helped his team reach the grand final in Las Vegas in which they finished in second place, with Peaty having won four out of the eight individual breaststroke events he competed in.

2020
Due to the worldwide COVID-19 pandemic both the 2020 Olympics and 2020 European Championships were postponed until 2021.

On 15 November 2020, at the International Swimming League meet in Budapest, Peaty competed as part of the London Roar team. He broke the world record for the short-course 100m breaststroke with a time of 55.49 seconds in the semi final, which was his first ever world record in short course meters. He then beat his own world record time in the 100m breaststroke one week later, swimming 55.41 seconds in the final. He ended up winning 6 out his 15 individual breaststroke events during the 2020 ISL season, as well as all 3 of the skins races he competed in.

In December Peaty and three fellow 2019 individual world championship medal-winning team-mates were pre-selected for the postponed Tokyo Olympics.

2021 
At the 2021 British Swimming Olympic trials Peaty won the 100m breaststroke title on the opening day of the championships at the London Aquatics Centre in a time of 57.39 seconds. In May 2021, he won his fourth successive gold medals in both the 100m breaststroke and the 50m breaststroke at the European Championships. He also won two further golds as part of the team in the mixed 4 × 100 metre medley and men's 4 x 100 m medley relays.

In July 2021, Peaty became the first British swimmer to defend an Olympic title. He won Britain's first gold medal at the 2020 Tokyo Olympic Games (held in 2021), beating Arno Kamminga of the Netherlands in the 100m breaststroke with a time of 57.37 seconds. He won a second gold in the mixed 4 × 100 metre medley relay, setting a world record time of 3 minutes 37.58 seconds together with Kathleen Dawson, James Guy and Anna Hopkin.

For the 2021 International Swimming League, Peaty was selected to the roster for team London Roar by fan vote. While Peaty remained on the regular and playoffs season rosters, he ultimately decided not to compete in the International Swimming League in 2021 as the league had still not paid him all of the money he earned from the 2020 year.

For the 21st century through the end of 2021, Peaty had set a total of 11 individual world records in short course and long course meters, ranking as number five behind Michael Phelps, Aaron Peirsol, Ryan Lochte, and Cameron van der Burgh in terms of total number of individual world records achieved by a male swimmer in the century.

2022
In March 2022, Peaty signed a professional sponsorship deal with Speedo. Approximately two months later, he announced that due to a fractured foot that required him to rest for 6 weeks, he would not be participating at the 2022 World Aquatics Championships held in June in Budapest.

Peaty returned to compete in the 2022 Commonwealth Games after his injury but was beaten in the final of the 100m breaststroke for the first time in 8 years, finishing fourth behind England team-mate James Wilby and Australians Zac Stubblety-Cook and Sam Williamson. Peaty later said that he didn’t know "what went wrong" and that he has "kind of lost that spark". Peaty later went on to win gold in the 50m breaststroke event for the first time at the Commonwealth Games, winning in a time of 26.76 seconds. After the race he said that he has his 'spark back' but did not go on to race in any of the relay events at the championships and also chose to skip the 2022 European Championships.

Later in the year, in December at the 2022 World Short Course Championships in Melbourne, Australia, Peaty won the bronze medal in the 100 metre breaststroke with a time of 56.25 seconds, which was 37-hundredths of a second behind gold medalist Nic Fink and 18-hundredths of a second behind silver medalist Nicolò Martinenghi, and marked the first medal for Great Britain at the Championships. One day earlier in the competition, on 14 December, he helped achieve a fourth-place finish in the 4×50 metre mixed medley relay, splitting a 25.24 to contribute to the final mark of 1:37.07, which set a new British record in the event. On 16 December, he placed eighteenth in the 200 metre breaststroke with a time of 2:07.31. For his final event of the Championships, the 50 metre breaststroke, he finished in a time of 25.99 seconds in the final to place sixth.

Personal life

While Peaty was training at Loughborough University, he met girlfriend Eirianedd Munro, a student at the University. In April 2020, he announced that the couple were expecting a baby boy. Their son was born on 11 September 2020. On 23 August 2022 he announced their breakup.

Peaty is a football fan, and supports Nottingham Forest. Among his many tattoos are an image of the Greek god Poseidon and the year 2016 in Roman numerals (MMXVI).

On 1 April 2016, Peaty started a YouTube channel, to which he published a number of videos; the first one on 14 April 2017 answered some common questions about himself.

From September to November 2021, Peaty was a contestant on the nineteenth series of Strictly Come Dancing. Paired with professional dancer Katya Jones, he reached week 7 coming in 9th place overall. For his time, efforts, and ninth-place finish, Peaty earned £40,000 directly.

Physical attributes
Peaty is physiologically particularly adapted to swimming the breast stroke; he has been described, like Michael Phelps, as "an anatomical freak". He is tall at 1.91 m (6 ft 3 in), with large hands and feet (shoe size 12), and has hypermobile, double-jointed knees and ankles. As his knees hyperextend he can kick particularly effectively; his ankles help by flexing in a way other people's ankles do not. He has also been described as having an "extraordinary" cardiovascular system.

Awards and honours

Peaty received the FINA award for Best Male Swimming Performance of 2015 after he won 3 gold medals at the World Championships in Kazan. In 2016, he was again honoured by FINA for the best male Olympic swimming performance of the year award after breaking the 100m breaststroke world record at the 2016 Olympics.

Peaty has won the Ligue Européenne de Natation (LEN) Award for best male swimmer for three times in four years for his performances in 2016, 2017 and 2019. He was the recipient of the award again in 2021.

Peaty was named Male World Swimmer of the Year by Swimming World Magazine in 2015 and 2018. He also won Male European Swimmer of the Year for 6 consecutive years from 2014 to 2019.

In August 2021, following the close of swimming at the 2020 Summer Olympics, Peaty and his mixed 4x100 metre medley relay teammates winning the gold medal and setting a new world record in the event was chosen as the number five moment at the 2020 Olympic Games in the sport of swimming by Olympics.com.

For the 2021 year, Peaty received the Sportsman of the Year award from the Sports Journalists' Association.

Peaty was appointed Member of the Order of the British Empire (MBE) in the 2017 New Year Honours and Officer of the Order of the British Empire (OBE) in the 2022 New Year Honours, both for services to swimming.

International championships (50 m)

International championships (25 m)

 Peaty swam only in the preliminaries.

Career best times

Long course metres

Short course metres

World records

Bibliography
 Peaty, Adam with Richard Waters. The Gladiator Mindset: Push Your Limits. Overcome Challenges. Achieve Your Goals. London, Quercus, 11 November 2021. .

See also

 World record progression 50 metres breaststroke
 World record progression 100 metres breaststroke
 World record progression 4 × 100 metres medley relay
 World and Olympic records set at the 2016 Summer Olympics
 World and Olympic records set at the 2020 Summer Olympics

References

External links

 
 
 
 
 
 
 

1994 births
Living people
Commonwealth Games gold medallists for England
Commonwealth Games silver medallists for England
English breaststroke swimmers
European Aquatics Championships medalists in swimming
Male breaststroke swimmers
Medalists at the FINA World Swimming Championships (25 m)
Medalists at the 2016 Summer Olympics
Medalists at the 2020 Summer Olympics
Olympic swimmers of Great Britain
People from Uttoxeter
Sportspeople from Staffordshire
Swimmers at the 2014 Commonwealth Games
Swimmers at the 2018 Commonwealth Games
Swimmers at the 2022 Commonwealth Games
Swimmers at the 2016 Summer Olympics
Swimmers at the 2020 Summer Olympics
World Aquatics Championships medalists in swimming
World record setters in swimming
World record holders in swimming
Olympic gold medalists in swimming
Olympic silver medalists in swimming
Commonwealth Games medallists in swimming
Officers of the Order of the British Empire
Male medley swimmers
Olympic gold medallists for Great Britain
Olympic silver medallists for Great Britain
Medallists at the 2014 Commonwealth Games
Medallists at the 2018 Commonwealth Games
Medallists at the 2022 Commonwealth Games